The 2022 Detroit Tigers season was the team's 122nd season and the 23rd at Comerica Park. This was the Tigers' second season under manager A. J. Hinch. Opening Day was held on April 8 and they hosted their divisional rival, the Chicago White Sox and the season ended on the road against the Seattle Mariners on October 5. The team wore KB patches in honor of former Tigers player and coach Kimera Bartee who died on December 20, 2021 at the age of 49.

On August 10, after accumulating a 43–68 record, the Tigers fired General Manager Al Avila after 21 seasons with the team. On September 19, the Tigers hired former San Francisco Giants General Manager Scott Harris as their new President of Baseball Operations.

The Tigers finished the season at 66–96, fourth place in their division, and failed to make the playoffs for the eighth consecutive season, tied with the Los Angeles Angels for the longest active playoff drought in the American League and Major League Baseball. Statistically, the Tigers were one of the worst-hitting teams in baseball this season. Their .231 team batting average ranked 25th in the majors, while the team finished dead last (30th) in home runs with 110.

Offseason

Lockout 

The expiration of the league's collective bargaining agreement (CBA) with the Major League Baseball Players Association occurred on December 1, 2021 with no new agreement in place. As a result, the team owners voted unanimously to lockout the players stopping all free agency and trades.
The next day, Commissioner of Baseball Rob Manfred announced a lockout of players, following expiration of the collective bargaining agreement (CBA) between the league and the Major League Baseball Players Association (MLBPA). On March 10, 2022, the MLB and MLBPA agreed to a new collective bargaining agreement, thus ending the lockout.  Although MLB previously announced that several series would be cancelled due to the lockout, the agreement provides for a 162-game season, with originally cancelled games to be made up via doubleheaders.

Rule changes 
Pursuant to the new CBA, several new rules were instituted for the 2022 season:
 The National League will adopt the designated hitter full-time.
 The postseason will expand from ten teams to twelve.
 Advertising patches and decals will appear on player uniforms and helmets for the first time.
 Due to the shortened spring training, teams will be able to carry 28 players from the start of the 2022 regular season through May 1. After May 1, teams must reduce their rosters to 26 players.

Also, a draft lottery will be implemented, beginning with the 2023 draft.

Coaching staff
 On January 27, 2022, the Tigers promoted Toledo Mud Hens manager Gary Jones to first base coach for the major league team, succeeding Kimera Bartee who passed away suddenly in late 2021. Former Tigers hitting coach Lloyd McClendon was hired to succeed Jones as Toledo Mud Hens manager.

Trades
 On November 3, the Tigers traded minor-league infielder Nick Quintana to the Cincinnati Reds in exchange for catcher Tucker Barnhart. On November 7, the Tigers exercised Barnhart's $7.5 million contract option for the 2022 season, signing him to the team.
 On April 4, the Tigers traded infielder Isaac Paredes and a competitive balance round B pick in the 2022 MLB draft to the Tampa Bay Rays in exchange for outfielder Austin Meadows.
 On April 13, the Tigers acquired minor-league utility player Jamie Westbrook from the Milwaukee Brewers in exchange for cash considerations and assigned him to the Toledo Mud Hens.
 On August 2, the Tigers traded outfielder Robbie Grossman to the Atlanta Braves for pitcher Kris Anglin.
 On August 2, the Tigers traded pitcher Michael Fulmer to the Minnesota Twins for pitcher Sawyer Gipson-Long.
 On August 14, the Tigers acquired minor league pitcher Ricardo Sánchez from the Philadelphia Phillies for cash considerations.

Signings
 On November 7, the Tigers selected the minor-league contract of pitcher Elvin Rodríguez, adding him to the 40-man roster.
 On November 16, the Tigers signed pitcher Eduardo Rodríguez to a five-year/$77 million contract, with an opt-out clause after the 2023 season.
 On November 19, the Tigers selected the minor-league contracts of infielder Kody Clemens and pitcher Ángel De Jesús, adding them to the 40-man roster.
 On December 1, the Tigers signed infielder Javier Báez to a six-year, $140 million contract.
 On December 1, the Tigers signed pitcher Jacob Barnes to a minor-league contract with an invitation to spring training. His contract was selected prior to opening day.
 On February 1, the Tigers signed pitcher Luis Castillo to a minor league contract. His contract was selected on August 6.
 On March 16, the Tigers signed pitcher Andrew Chafin to a two-year, $13 million contract.
 On March 19, the Tigers signed pitcher Michael Pineda to a one-year, $5.5 million contract.
 On March 22, the Tigers reached one-year contract agreements with infielders Jeimer Candelario ($5.8 million) and Harold Castro ($1.275 million), outfielder Víctor Reyes ($1.4 million), catcher Dustin Garneau ($1.175 million), and pitchers Michael Fulmer ($4.95 million), Joe Jiménez ($1.79 million) and José Cisnero ($1.9 million), avoiding arbitration with all players.
 On April 14, the Tigers signed pitchers Derek Law and Bubba Derby to minor-league contracts. Law's contract was selected on July 30.
 On July 19, the Tigers signed pitcher Chi Chi Gonzalez to a minor league contract. On August 26, he opted out of that contract. He signed a minor league contract with the New York Yankees on August 31.
 On July 26, the Tigers signed pitcher Daniel Norris to a minor-league contract. His contract was selected on August 12.
 On September 9, the Tigers signed pitcher Daniel Ponce de Leon to a minor league contract.

Releases
 On October 6, outfielder JaCoby Jones declined a minor-league assignment and declared free agency. Jones subsequently signed a minor-league contract with the Kansas City Royals.
 On November 3, pitchers Wily Peralta, Julio Teherán, José Ureña and Derek Holland declared free agency. On March 16, Peralta re-signed with the Tigers on a minor-league contract that includes an invitation to spring training. On March 18, Holland signed a minor-league contract with the Boston Red Sox that includes an invitation to spring training. On March 29, Ureña signed with the Milwaukee Brewers. On April 21, Teherán signed with the Staten Island FerryHawks of the Atlantic League of Professional Baseball.
 On November 5, pitchers Drew Hutchison and Ian Krol were outrighted to the minors. Both players declined their minor-league assignments and declared free agency. On March 14, Hutchison re-signed with the Tigers on a minor-league deal, with an invitation to spring training. On March 18, Krol signed a minor-league contract with the San Diego Padres.
 On November 9, pitcher Locke St. John declared free agency. On November 29, St. John signed a minor-league contract with the Chicago Cubs.
 On November 9, outfielder Christin Stewart declined a minor-league assignment and declared free agency. Stewart subsequently signed a minor-league contract with the Boston Red Sox.
 On November 19, the Tigers cut utility player Niko Goodrum from the 40-man roster, outrighting him to the minor-leagues. Goodrum cleared waivers and became a free agent. The Tigers also removed outfielder Jacob Robson and pitcher Nivaldo Rodríguez from the 40-man roster, outrighting each player to Triple-A Toledo. On March 15, Goodrum signed with the Houston Astros.
On November 29, catcher Grayson Greiner cleared waivers and elected free agency. On March 14, Greiner signed a minor-league contract with the Arizona Diamondbacks that included an invitation to spring training.
On November 30, pitcher Matthew Boyd was not tendered a contract and became a free agent. On March 20, 2022, Boyd finalized a contract with the San Francisco Giants on a one-year contract worth $5.2 million plus incentive bonuses.
On May 13, pitcher Drew Hutchison declined a minor-league assignment and declared free agency. On May 23, he signed a minor-league contract with the Tigers and rejoined the team on June 14. After being designated for assignment and electing free agency, Hutchison once again signed a minor-league contract with the Tigers on June 27. He rejoined the team on July 5.
On June 14, pitcher Jacob Barnes was designated for assignment. After electing free agency, Barnes signed a minor-league contract with the Seattle Mariners on June 22. After being released  by the Mariners, Barnes signed a minor league contract with the Tigers on July 26. After being released from his contract on August 26, Barnes signed a minor league contract with the New York Yankees on August 31.
On August 1, outfielder Derek Hill was designated for assignment. He was claimed off waivers by the Seattle Mariners on August 5.
On August 5, pitcher Derek Law was designated for assignment. On August 14, he signed a minor league contract with the Cincinnati Reds.
On August 19, pitcher Wily Peralta was designated for assignment. He was released on August 22. On February 3, 2023, he signed a minor league contract with the Washington Nationals with an invitation to spring training.
On September 4, pitcher Michael Pineda was designated for assignment. He was released on September 7.

Season standings

American League Central

American League Wild

Record against opponents

Season highlights

Individual accomplishments

Hitting
On April 23, Miguel Cabrera became the 33rd player in MLB history to join the 3,000 hit club. He was the third Tigers player to do so, after Ty Cobb and Al Kaline, and the first Venezuelan to reach the milestone.
On May 7, Miguel Cabrera recorded his 600th career double. He became the third player in MLB history to record 3,000 hits, 600 doubles, and 500 home runs, following Hank Aaron and Albert Pujols.
On July 2, Riley Greene hit a walk-off home run for his first career MLB home run. He became the first Tigers player since Lou Whitaker in 1978 to accomplish this feat.

Game log

|- style="background:#bfb;"
| 1 || April 8 || White Sox || 5–4 || Soto (1–0) || Hendriks (0–1) || — || 43,480 || 1–0 || W1
|- style="background:#fbb;"
| 2 || April 9 || White Sox || 2–5 || Cease (1–0) || Mize (0–1) || Bummer (1) || 17,469 || 1–1 || L1
|- style="background:#fbb;"
| 3 || April 10 || White Sox || 1–10 || Crick (1–0) || Skubal (0–1) || — || 15,712 || 1–2 || L2
|- style="background:#bfb;"
| 4 || April 11 || Red Sox || 3–1 || Fulmer (1–0) || Davis (0–1) || Soto (1) || 11,840 || 2–2 || W1
|- style="background:#fbb;"
| 5 || April 12 || Red Sox || 3–5 || Whitlock (1–0) || Lange (0–1) || — || 15,781 || 2–3 || L1
|- style="background:#fbb;"
| 6 || April 13 || Red Sox || 7–9 || Eovaldi (1–0) || Ed. Rodríguez (0–1) || Robles (1) || 10,522 || 2–4 || L2
|- style="background:#bfb;"
| 7 || April 14 || @ Royals || 4–2 || Jiménez (1–0) || Brentz (0–2) || Soto (2) || 9,595 || 3–4 || W1
|- style="background:#bfb;"
| 8 || April 15 || @ Royals || 2–1 || Barnes (1–0) || Keller (0–1) || Fulmer (1) || 16,720 || 4–4 || W2
|- style="background:#fbb;"
| 9 || April 16 || @ Royals || 1–3 || Snider (2–0) || Vest (0–1) || Staumont (1) || 19,022 || 4–5 || L1
|- style="background:#bbb;"
| — || April 17 || @ Royals ||  colspan="9" | Postponed (inclement weather). Rescheduled to July 11.
|- style="background:#fbb;"
| 10 || April 19 || Yankees || 2–4 || Schmidt (1–2) || Alexander (0–1) || Chapman (2) || 15,490 || 4–6 || L2
|- style="background:#fbb;"
| 11 || April 20 || Yankees || 3–5 || Green (1–1) || Hutchison (0–1) || Chapman (3) || 17,268 || 4–7 || L3
|- style="background:#bfb;"
| 12 || April 21 || Yankees || 3–0 || Pineda (1–0) || Montgomery (0–1) || Soto (3) || 21,529 || 5–7 || W1
|- style="background:#bbb;"
| — || April 22 || Rockies ||  colspan="9" | Postponed (inclement weather). Rescheduled to April 23.
|- style="background:#bfb;"
| 13 || April 23 || Rockies || 13–0 || Skubal (1–1) || Senzatela (1–1) || — || 37,566 || 6–7 || W2
|- style="background:#fbb;"
| 14 || April 23 || Rockies || 2–3 || Gomber (1–1) || Brieske (0–1) || Colomé (2) || 28,635 || 6–8 || L1
|- style="background:#fbb;"
| 15 || April 24 || Rockies || 2–6 || Kuhl (1–0) || Alexander (0–2) || — || 20,088 || 6–9 || L2
|- style="background:#fbb;"
| 16 || April 26 || @ Twins || 4–5 || Jax (1–0) || Soto (1–1) || — || 11,803 || 6–10 || L3
|- style="background:#fbb;"
| 17 || April 27 || @ Twins || 0–5 || Ryan (3–1) || Pineda (1–1) || — || 11,829 || 6–11 || L4
|- style="background:#fbb;"
| 18 || April 28 || @ Twins || 1–7 || Stashak (1–0) || Skubal (1–2) || Jax (1) || 19,365 || 6–12 || L5
|- style="background:#fbb;"
| 19 || April 29 || @ Dodgers || 1–5 || Anderson (2–0) || Alexander (0–3) || — || 49,394 || 6–13 || L6
|- style="background:#bfb;"
| 20 || April 30 || @ Dodgers || 5–1 || Barnes (2–0) || Phillips (1–1) || — || 52,613 || 7–13 || W1
|-

|- style="background:#fbb;"
| 21 || May 1 || @ Dodgers || 3–6 || Buehler (3–1) || Ed. Rodríguez (0–2) || Kimbrel (4) || 51,172 || 7–14 || L1
|- style="background:#bbb;"
| — || May 3 || Pirates ||  colspan="9" | Postponed (inclement weather). Rescheduled to May 4.
|- style="background:#bfb;"
| 22 || May 4 || Pirates || 3–2 || Lange (1–1) || Wilson (0–1) || Soto (4) || 15,150 || 8–14 || W1
|- style="background:#fbb;"
| 23 || May 4 || Pirates || 2–7 || Thompson (1–3) || Hutchison (0–2) || Bednar (2) || 15,150 || 8–15 || L1
|- style="background:#fbb;"
| 24 || May 5 || @ Astros || 2–3 || Pressly (1–1) || Soto (1–2) || — || 24,116 || 8–16 || L2
|- style="background:#fbb;"
| 25 || May 6 || @ Astros || 2–3 || García (2–1) || Brieske (0–2) || Montero (3) || 38,020 || 8–17 || L3
|- style="background:#fbb;"
| 26 || May 7 || @ Astros || 2–3 || Abreu (1–0) || Fulmer (1–1) || Pressly (4) || 34,109 || 8–18 || L4
|- style="background:#fbb;"
| 27 || May 8 || @ Astros || 0–5 || Odorizzi (3–2) || Hutchison (0–3) || — || 36,934 || 8–19 || L5
|- style="background:#fbb;"
| 28 || May 9 || Athletics || 0–2 || Blackburn (4–0) || Pineda (1–2) || Jiménez (5) || 12,674 || 8–20 || L6
|- style="background:#bfb;"
| 29 || May 10 || @ Athletics || 6–0 || Skubal (2–2) || Montas (2–3) || — || 13,844 || 9–20 || W1
|- style="background:#fbb;"
| 30 || May 10 || Athletics || 1–4 || Martínez (1–0) || Faedo (0–1) || — || 13,844 || 9–21 || L1
|- style="background:#fbb;"
| 31 || May 11 || Athletics || 0–9 || Logue (2–1) || Wentz (0–1) || — ||  15,375 || 9–22 || L2
|- style="background:#fbb;"
| 32 || May 12 || Athletics || 3–5 || Puk (1–0) || Fulmer (1–2) || Jiménez (6) || 17,565 || 9–23 || L3
|- style="background:#bfb;"
| 33 || May 13 || Orioles || 4–2 || Ed. Rodríguez (1–2) || Lyles (2–3) || Vest (1) || 23,941 || 10–23 || W1
|- style="background:#bfb;"
| 34 || May 14 || Orioles || 3–0 || Peralta (1–0) || Zimmermann (2–2) || Soto (5) || 28,016 || 11–23 || W2
|- style="background:#bfb;"
| 35 || May 15 || Orioles || 5–1 || Skubal (3–2) || Wells (1–3) || — || 20,080 || 12–23 || W3
|- style="background:#bfb;"
| 36 || May 16 || @ Rays || 3–2 || Fulmer (2–2) || Kittredge (3–1) || Soto (6) || 11,532 || 13–23 || W4
|- style="background:#fbb;"
| 37 || May 17 || @ Rays || 1–8 || McClanahan (3–2) || Brieske (0–3) || — || 8,475 || 13–24 || L1
|- style="background:#fbb;"
| 38 || May 18 || @ Rays || 1–6 || Rasmussen (4–1) || Ed. Rodríguez (1–3) || — || 9,706 || 13–25 || L2
|- style="background:#fbb;"
| 39 || May 20 || @ Guardians || 1–6 || Civale (2–3) || Barnes (3–1) || — || 23,874 || 13–26 || L3
|- style="background:#bbb;"
| — || May 21 || @ Guardians ||  colspan="9" | Postponed (inclement weather). Rescheduled to July 14.
|- style="background:#bfb;"
| 40 || May 22 || @ Guardians || 4–2 || Faedo (1–1) || Bieber (1–3) || Soto (7) || 15,554 || 14–26 || W1
|- style="background:#fbb;"
| 41 || May 23 || @ Twins || 4–5 || Pagán (1–1) || Chafin (0–1) || — || 16,361 || 14–27 || L1
|- style="background:#fbb;"
| 42 || May 24 || @ Twins || 0–2 || Gray (2–1) || Brieske (0–4) || Durán (4) || 17,882 || 14–28 || L2
|- style="background:#bfb;"
| 43 || May 25 || @ Twins || 4–2  || Lange (1–1) || Megill (0–1) || Chafin (1) || 20,375 || 15–28 || W1
|- style="background:#bfb;"
| 44 || May 26 || Guardians || 4–3 || Soto (2–2) || Stephan (2–2) || — || 12,764 || 16–28 || W2
|- style="background:#bbb;"
| — || May 27 || Guardians ||  colspan="9" | Postponed (inclement weather). Rescheduled to July 4.
|- style="background:#fbb;"
| 45 || May 28 || Guardians || 1–8 || Bieber (2–3) || Faedo (1–2) || — || 26,134 || 16–29 || L1
|- style="background:#bfb;"
| 46 || May 29 || Guardians || 2–1 || Lange (2–1) || McKenzie (3–4) || Soto (8) || 19,990 || 17–29 || W1
|- style="background:#bfb;"
| 47 || May 30 || Twins || 7–5 || Jiménez (2–0) || Smith (1–1) || Soto (9) || 15,191 || 18–29 || W2
|- style="background:#fbb;"
| 48 || May 31 || Twins || 2–8 || Smeltzer (2–0) || R. García (0–1) || — || 11,756 || 18–30 || L1
|- style="background:#bfb;"
| 49 || May 31 || Twins || 4–0 || Peralta (2–0) || Sands (0–1) || — || 12,122 || 19–30 || W1
|-

|- style="background:#bfb;"
| 50 || June 1 || Twins || 5–0 || Skubal (4–2) || Ober (1–2) || — || 13,211 || 20–30 || W2
|- style="background:#bfb;"
| 51 || June 2 || Twins || 3–2 || Lange (3–1) || Pagán (1–2) || Soto (10) || 17,972 || 21–30 || W3
|- style="background:#fbb;"
| 52 || June 3 || @ Yankees || 0–13 || Cole (5–1) || El. Rodríguez (0–1) || — || 42,026 || 21–31 || L1
|- style="background:#fbb;"
| 53 || June 4 || @ Yankees || 0–3 || Severino (4–1) || Brieske (0–5) || Holmes (8) || 38,106 || 21–32 || L2
|- style="background:#fbb;"
| 54 || June 5 || @ Yankees || 4–5  || King (3–1) || Soto (2–3) || — || 38,040 || 21–33 || L3
|- style="background:#bfb;"
| 55 || June 7 || @ Pirates || 5–3 || Skubal (5–2) || Quintana (1–3) || Soto (11) || 10,214 || 22–33 || W1
|- style="background:#bfb;"
| 56 || June 8 || @ Pirates || 3–1 || Vest (1–1) || Crowe (2–3) || Soto (12) || 11,723 || 23–33 || W2
|- style="background:#fbb;"
| 57 || June 10 || Blue Jays || 1–10 || Berríos (5–2) || El. Rodríguez (0–2) || — || 26,226 || 23–34 || L1
|- style="background:#bfb;"
| 58 || June 11 || Blue Jays || 3–1 || Brieske (1–5) || Gausman (5–5) || Soto (13) || 30,738 || 24–34 || W1
|- style="background:#fbb;"
| 59 || June 12 || Blue Jays || 0–6 || Stripling (3–1) || Skubal (5–3) || — || 29,399 || 24–35 || L1
|- style="background:#fbb;"
| 60 || June 13 || White Sox || 5–9 || Sousa (3–0) || R. García (0–2) || — || 16,634 || 24–36 || L2
|- style="background:#fbb;"
| 61 || June 14 || White Sox || 1–5 || Cease (5–3) || Hutchison (0–4) || — || 16,450 || 24–37 || L3
|- style="background:#fbb;"
| 62 || June 15 || White Sox || 0–13 || Martin (1–2) || Faedo (1–3) || — || 20,726 || 24–38 || L4
|- style="background:#fbb;"
| 63 || June 16 || Rangers || 1–3 || Santana (3–2) || Soto (2–4) || Barlow (12) || 17,448 || 24–39 || L5
|- style="background:#fbb;"
| 64 || June 17 || Rangers || 0–7 ||  Gray (2–3) || Skubal (5–4) || — || 21,996 || 24–40 || L6
|- style="background:#bfb;"
| 65 || June 18 || Rangers || 14–7 || R. García (1–2) || Hearn (4–5) || — || 28,179 || 25–40 || W1
|- style="background:#bfb;"
| 66 || June 19 || Rangers || 7–3 || Lange (4–1) || Dunning (1–5) || — || 25,919 || 26–40 || W2
|- style="background:#fbb;"
| 67 || June 20 || @ Red Sox || 2–5 || Winckowski (2–1) || Faedo (1–4) || Houck (5) || 34,811 || 26–41 || L1
|- style="background:#fbb;"
| 68 || June 21 || @ Red Sox || 4–5 ||  Hill (3–4) || Brieske (1–6) || Schreiber (2) || 29,168 || 26–42 || L2
|- style="background:#fbb;"
| 69 || June 22 || @ Red Sox || 2–6 || Wacha (6–1) || Skubal (5–5) || — || 35,180 || 26–43 || L3
|- style="background:#bfb;"
| 70 || June 24 || @ Diamondbacks || 5–1 || R. García (2–2) || Kelly (6–5) || — || 22,064 || 27–43 || W1
|- style="background:#bfb;"
| 71 || June 25 || @ Diamondbacks || 6–3 || Alexander (1–3) || Mantiply (1–1) || Soto (14) || 23,129 || 28–43 || W2
|- style="background:#fbb;"
| 72 || June 26 || @ Diamondbacks || 7–11 || Wendelken (2–1) || Vest (1–2) || — || 22,529 || 28–44 || L1
|- style="background:#fbb;"
| 73 || June 28 || @ Giants || 3–4 || Rodón (7–4) || Skubal (5–6) || Doval (12) || 28,004 || 28–45 || L2
|- style="background:#bfb;"
| 74 || June 29 || @ Giants || 3–2 || R. García (3–2) || Wood (5–7) || Soto (15) || 26,576 || 29–45 || W1
|-

|- style="background:#fbb;"
| 75 || July 1 || Royals || 1–3 || Keller (3–9) || Pineda (1–3) || Barlow (11) || 24,349 || 29–46 || L1
|- style="background:#bfb;"
| 76 || July 2 || Royals || 4–3 || Jiménez (3–0) || Payamps (2–2) ||  — || 23,502 || 30–46 || W1
|- style="background:#fbb;"
| 77 || July 3 || Royals || 4–7 || Cuas (2–0) || Skubal (5–7) || Barlow (12) || 21,625 || 30–47 || L1
|- style="background:#bfb;"
| 78 || July 4 || Guardians || 4–1 || Hill (1–0) || Plesac (2–6) || Soto (16) || 19,737 || 31–47 || W1
|- style="background:#bfb;"
| 79 || July 4 || Guardians || 5–3 || Alexander (2–3) || Stephan (3–3) || Jiménez (1) || 24,395 || 32–47 || W2
|- style="background:#bfb;"
| 80 || July 5 || Guardians || 11–4 || Hutchison (1–4) || Quantrill (4–5) || — || 16,662 || 33–47 || W3
|- style="background:#bfb;"
| 81 || July 6 || Guardians || 8–2 || Pineda (2–3) || Bieber (3–5) || — || 17,829 || 34–47 || W4
|- style="background:#bfb;"
| 82 || July 7 || @ White Sox || 2–1 || Brieske (2–6) || Cease (7–4) || Soto (17) || 21,876 || 35–47 || W5
|- style="background:#bfb;"
| 83 || July 8 || @ White Sox || 7–5 || Skubal (6–7) || Giolito (5–5) || Fulmer (2) || 29,215 || 36–47 || W6
|- style="background:#fbb;"
| 84 || July 9 || @ White Sox || 0–8 || Cueto (3–4) || Hill (1–1) || — || 29,215 || 36–48 || L1
|- style="background:#fbb;"
| 85 || July 10 || @ White Sox || 2–4 || Graveman (3–1) || Fulmer (2–3) || Hendriks (17) || 31,072 || 36–49 || L2
|- style="background:#fbb;"
| 86 || July 11 || @ Royals || 1–3 || Keller (5–9) || Pineda (2–4) || Barlow (14) || 11,084 || 36–50 || L3
|- style="background:#fbb;"
| 87 || July 11 || @ Royals || 3–7 || Zerpa (1–0) || Faedo (1–5) || — || 16,202 || 36–51 || L4
|- style="background:#bfb;"
| 88 || July 12 || @ Royals || 7–5 || Brieske (3–6) || Cuas (2–1) || Soto (18) || 14,541 || 37–51 || W1
|- style="background:#fbb;"
| 89 || July 13 || @ Royals || 2–5 || Singer (4–3) || Skubal (6–8) || Barlow (15) || 11,016 || 37–52 || L1
|- style="background:#fbb;"
| 90 || July 14 || @ Guardians || 0–4 || McKenzie (7–6) || El. Rodríguez (0–3) || — || 14,327 || 37–53 || L2
|- style="background:#fbb;"
| 91 || July 15 || @ Guardians || 5–6 || Shaw (4–1) || Fulmer (2–4) || Stephan (2) || 27,846 || 37–54 || L3
|- style="background:#fbb;"
| 92 || July 16 || @ Guardians || 0–10 || Quantrill (6–5) || Pineda (2–5) || — || 26,789 || 37–55 || L4
|- style="background:#bbb;"
| — || July 17 || @ Guardians || colspan="9" | Postponed (inclement weather). Rescheduled to August 15.
|- style="text-align:center; background:#bbcaff;"
| colspan="10" | 2022 Major League Baseball All-Star Game
|- style="background:#bfb;"
| 93 || July 21 || @ Athletics || 7–2 || Skubal (7–8) || Logue (3–5) || — || 7,282 || 38–55 || W1
|- style="background:#fbb;"
| 94 || July 21 || @ Athletics || 0–5 || Acevedo (2–2) || Hill (1–2) || — || 7,282 || 38–56 || L1
|- style="background:#fbb;"
| 95 || July 23 || Twins || 4–8 || Ryan (7–3) || Pineda (2–6) || — || 34,205 || 38–57 || L2
|- style="background:#fbb;"
| 96 || July 24 || Twins || 1–9 || Gray (5–3) || R. García (3–3) || — || 23,570 || 38–58 || L3
|- style="background:#bfb;"
| 97 || July 25 || Padres || 12–4 || Vest (2–2) || Manaea (5–5) || — || 21,647 || 39–58 || W1
|- style="background:#fbb;"
| 98 || July 26 || Padres || 4–6  || Rogers (1–4) || Soto (2–5) || Martinez (4) || 24,213 || 39–59 || L1
|- style="background:#bfb;"
| 99 || July 27 || Padres || 4–3 || Fulmer (3–4) || Rogers (1–5) || — || 24,669 || 40–59 || W1
|- style="background:#fbb;"
| 100 || July 28 || @ Blue Jays || 3–5 || Kikuchi (4–5) || Alexander (2–4) || Romano (22) || 27,080 || 40–60 || L1
|- style="background:#bfb;"
| 101 || July 29 || @ Blue Jays || 4–2 || Vest (3–2) || Manoah (11–5) || Soto (19) || 28,046 || 41–60 || W1
|- style="background:#fbb;"
| 102 || July 30 || @ Blue Jays || 3–5 || Richards (3–1) || Law (0–1) || Romano (23) || 42,933 || 41–61 || L1
|- style="background:#fbb;"
| 103 || July 31 || @ Blue Jays || 1–4 || Berríos (8–4) || Hill (1–3) || Romano (24) || 40,298 || 41–62 || L2
|-

|- style="background:#fbb;"
| 104 || August 1 || @ Twins || 3–5  || Jax (5–2) || Lange (4–2) || — || 20,231 || 41–63 || L3
|- style="background:#bfb;"
| 105 || August 2 || @ Twins || 5–3 || Foley (1–0) || Jax (5–3) || Soto (20) || 23,394 || 42–63 || W1
|- style="background:#fbb;"
| 106 || August 3 || @ Twins || 1–4 || Ryan (8–4) || Alexander (2–5) || López (20) || 25,044 || 42–64 || L1
|- style="background:#fbb;"
| 107 || August 4 || Rays || 2–6 || Springs (4–3) || Hutchison (1–5) || — || 16,595 || 42–65 || L2
|- style="background:#fbb;"
| 108 || August 5 || Rays || 3–5 || Beeks (2–1) || Jiménez (3–1) || Poche (7) || 21,547 || 42–66 || L3
|- style="background:#bfb;"
| 109 || August 6 || Rays || 9–1 || Hill (2–3) || McClanahan (10–5) || — || 40,101 || 43–66 || W1
|- style="background:#fbb;"
| 110 || August 7 || Rays || 0–7 || Poche (4–1) || Soto (2–6) || — || 18,395 || 43–67 || L1
|- style="background:#fbb;"
| 111 || August 9 || Guardians || 2–5 || Bieber (7–6) || Alexander (2–6) || Clase (25) || 16,359 || 43–68 || L2
|- style="background:#fbb;"
| 112 || August 10 || Guardians || 2–3 || Shaw (5–2) || Hutchison (1–6) || Clase (26) || 16,560 || 43–69 || L3
|- style="background:#fbb;"
| 113 || August 11 || Guardians || 3–4  || De Los Santos (3–0) || Soto (2–7) || Shaw (1) || 19,036 || 43–70 || L4
|- style="background:#fbb;"
| 114 || August 12 || @ White Sox || 0–2 || López (5–2) || Lange (4–3) || Hendriks (24) || 33,015 || 43–71 || L5
|- style="background:#fbb;"
| 115 || August 13 || @ White Sox || 4–6 || Giolito (9–6) || Jiménez (3–2) || Hendriks (25) || 29,458 || 43–72 || L6
|- style="background:#fbb;"
| 116 || August 14 || @ White Sox || 3–5 || Lynn (3–5) || Alexander (2–7) || Graveman (6) || 32,154 || 43–73 || L7
|- style="background:#fbb;"
| 117 || August 15 || @ Guardians || 1–4 || Karinchak (1–0) || Vest (3–3) || Clase (27) || 16,980 || 43–74 || L8
|- style="background:#bfb;"
| 118 || August 15 || @ Guardians || 7–5 || B. Garcia (1–0) || Morgan (4–3) || Soto (21) || 16,980 || 44–74 || W1
|- style="background:#bfb;"
| 119 || August 16 || @ Guardians || 4–3 || Hill (3–3) || Plesac (2–11) || Soto (22) || 13,503 || 45–74 || W2
|- style="background:#fbb;"
| 120 || August 17 || @ Guardians || 4–8 || Shaw (6–2) || Chafin (0–2) || — || 14,335 || 45–75 || L1
|- style="background:#fbb;"
| 121 || August 19 || Angels || 0–1 || Sandoval (4–8) || Manning (0–1) || — || 28,197 || 45–76 || L2
|- style="background:#bfb;"
| 122 || August 20 || Angels || 4–3 || Alexander (3–7) || Detmers (4–4) || Soto (23) || 23,581 || 46–76 || W1
|- style="background:#bfb;"
| 123 || August 21 || Angels || 4–0 || Ed. Rodríguez (2–3) || Ohtani (10–8) || — || 23,064 || 47–76 || W2
|- style="background:#fbb;"
| 124 || August 23 || Giants || 1–3 || Rodón (12–6) || Hutchison (1–7) || Doval (18) || 21,123 || 47–77 || L1
|- style="background:#bfb;"
| 125 || August 24 || Giants || 6–1 || Manning (1–1) || Webb (11–7) || — || 17,400 || 48–77 || W1
|- style="background:#fbb;"
| 126 || August 26 || @ Rangers || 6–7 || Otto (6–8) || Alexander (3–8) || Leclerc (2) || 20,357 || 48–78 || L1
|- style="background:#bfb;"
| 127 || August 27 || @ Rangers || 11–2 || Ed. Rodríguez (3–3) || Keuchel (2–8) || — || 34,357 || 49–78 || W1
|- style="background:#bfb;"
| 128 || August 28 || @ Rangers || 9–8 || Hutchison (2–7) || Arihara (2–1) || Jiménez (2) || 24,938 || 50–78 || W2
|- style="background:#fbb;"
| 129 || August 30 || Mariners || 3–9 || Kirby (6–3) || Manning (1–2) || Flexen (1) || 12,536 || 50–79 || L1
|- style="background:#fbb;"
| 130 || August 31 || Mariners || 3–5 || Gonzales (10–12) || Lange (4–4) || Sewald (17) || 13,666 || 50–80 || L2
|-

|- style="background:#fbb;"
| 131 || September 1 || Mariners || 0–7 || Gilbert (11–5) || Ed. Rodríguez (3–4) || — || 14,393 || 50–81 || L3
|- style="background:#bfb;"
| 132 || September 2 || Royals || 5–4 || Chafin (1–2) || Hernández (0–4) || Soto (24) || 16,067 || 51–81 || W1
|- style="background:#fbb;"
| 133 || September 3 || Royals || 2–12 || Heasley (3–7) || Pineda (2–7) || — || 15,259 || 51–82 || L1
|- style="background:#fbb;"
| 134 || September 4 || Royals || 2–3 || Coleman (4–1) || Soto (2–8) || Barlow (21) || 15,206 || 51–83 || L2
|- style="background:#fbb;"
| 135 || September 5 || @ Angels || 0–10 || Suárez (6–6) || Alexander (3–9) || — || 19,518 || 51–84 || L3
|- style="background:#fbb;"
| 136 || September 6 || @ Angels || 4–5  || Tepera (4–2) || Chafin (1–3) || — || 20,002 || 51–85 || L4
|- style="background:#bfb;"
| 137 || September 7 || @ Angels || 5–4 || Cisnero (1–0) || Quijada (0–4) || Soto (25) || 15,756 || 52–85 || W1
|- style="background:#bfb;"
| 138 || September 9 || @ Royals || 10–2 || Wentz (1–1) || Lynch (4–10) || — || 14,556 || 53–85 || W2
|- style="background:#bfb;"
| 139 || September 10 || @ Royals || 8–4  || Manning (2–2) || Heasley (3–8) || — || 15,929 || 54–85 || W3
|- style="background:#fbb;"
| 140 || September 11 || @ Royals || 0–4 || Singer (8–4) || Alexander (3–10) || — || 13,150 || 54–86 || L1
|- style="background:#fbb;"
| 141 || September 12 || Astros || 0–7 || Valdez (15–5) || Ed. Rodríguez (3–5) || — || 13,054 || 54–87 || L2
|- style="background:#fbb;"
| 142 || September 13 || Astros || 3–6 || Brown (2–0) || Hutchison (2–8) || Pressly (27) || 13,820 || 54–88 || L3
|- style="background:#fbb;"
| 143 || September 14 || Astros || 1–2 || Javier (9–9) || Wentz (1–2) || Pressly (28) || 13,947 || 54–89 || L4
|- style="background:#bfb;"
| 144 || September 16 || White Sox || 3–2  || Lange (5–4) || Hendriks (3–4) || — || 16,335 || 55–89 || W1
|- style="background:#fbb;"
| 145 || September 17 || White Sox || 3–4  || Hendriks (4–4) || Soto (2–9) || Bummer (2) || 17,579 || 55–90 || L1
|- style="background:#fbb;"
| 146 || September 18 || White Sox || 5–11 || Banks (2–0) || Hutchison (2–9) || — || 14,435 || 55–91 || L2
|- style="background:#bfb;"
| 147 || September 19 || @ Orioles || 11–0 || Alexander (4–10) || Wells (7–7) || — || 10,201 || 56–91 || W1
|- style="background:#bfb;"
| 148 || September 20 || @ Orioles || 3–2 || Wentz (2–2) || Voth (5–3) || Soto (26) || 9,582 || 57–91 || W2
|- style="background:#fbb;"
| 149 || September 21 || @ Orioles || 1–8 || Lyles (11–11) || Manning (2–3) || — || 9,314 || 57–92 || L1
|- style="background:#bfb;"
| 150 || September 23 || @ White Sox || 5–3 || Ed. Rodríguez (4–5) || López (5–4) || Soto (27) || 33,257 || 58–92 || W1
|- style="background:#bfb;"
| 151 || September 24 || @ White Sox || 7–2 || Hutchison (3–9) || Martin (2–5) || — || 36,177 || 59–92 || W2
|- style="background:#bfb;"
| 152 || September 25 || @ White Sox || 4–1 || Chafin (2–3) || Graveman (3–4) || Soto (28) || 33,549 || 60–92 || W3
|- style="background:#bfb;"
| 153 || September 27 || Royals || 4–3  || Lange (6–4) || Misiewicz (2–2) || — || 13,334 || 61–92 || W4
|- style="background:#bfb;"
| 154 || September 28 || Royals || 2–1 || Norris (1–4) || Lynch (4–12) || Soto (29) || 12,610 || 62–92 || W5
|- style="background:#bfb;"
| 155 || September 29 || Royals || 10–3 || Ed. Rodríguez (5–5) || Heasley (4–9) || — || 13,137 || 63–92 || W6
|- style="background:#fbb;"
| 156 || September 30 || Twins || 0–7 || Ryan (13–8) || Alexander (4–11) || — || 18,505 || 63–93 || L1
|-

|- style="background:#bfb;"
| 157 || October 1 || Twins || 3–2 || Norris (2–4) || Henríquez (0–1) || Chafin (2) || 18,307 || 64–93 || W1
|- style="background:#bfb;"
| 158 || October 2 || Twins || 5–2 || Lange (7–4) || Woods Richardson (0–1) || Soto (30) || 20,105 || 65–93 || W2
|- style="background:#bfb;"
| 159 || October 3 || @ Mariners || 4–3 || B. Garcia (2–0) || Kirby (8–5) || Chafin (3) || 23,463 || 66–93 || W3
|- style="background:#fbb;"
| 160 || October 4 || @ Mariners || 6–7  || Torrens (1–0) || Soto (2–10) || — || 24,564 || 66–94 || L1
|- style="background:#fbb;"
| 161 || October 4 || @ Mariners || 6–9 || Sheffield (1–0) || El. Rodríguez (0–4) || Castillo (7) || 24,564 || 66–95 || L2
|- style="background:#fbb;"
| 162 || October 5 || @ Mariners || 4–5 || Swanson (3–2) || Soto (2–11) || — || 22,053 || 66–96 || L3
|-

|- style="text-align:center;"
| Legend:       = Win       = Loss       = PostponementBold = Tigers team member

Roster

Player stats

Batting 
Note: G = Games played; AB = At bats; R = Runs scored; H = Hits; 2B = Doubles; 3B = Triples; HR = Home runs; RBI = Runs batted in; BB = Walks; K = Strikeouts; SB = Stolen bases; AVG = Batting average; 

+Totals with Tigers only.

Pitching 
Note: W = Wins; L = Losses; ERA = Earned run average; WHIP = Walks plus hits per inning pitched; G = Games pitched; GS = Games started; SV = Saves; IP = Innings pitched; H = Hits allowed; R = Runs allowed; ER = Earned runs allowed; BB = Walks allowed; K = Strikeouts

+Totals with Tigers only.

Farm system

References

External links
2022 Detroit Tigers at Baseball Reference
Detroit Tigers official site

Detroit Tigers seasons
Detroit Tigers
Detroit Tigers